Mac Brandt is an American actor best known for his roles as C.O. Mack Andrews on the Fox crime drama Prison Break (2005–06), and as Mac Sullivan on the Audience Network sports drama Kingdom (2014–17).

He is a native of the Lombard, Illinois area and a 1998 graduate of Montini Catholic High School, where he served as the president of student government and starting nose guard of the football team.

Filmography
The Art of Stalking - The Cop (2007)
Hammer of the Gods - Baldur
The Family Tree - Young Police Officer (2011)
The List - The Sentry (2013)
Gangster Squad - Bruiser (2013)
Sleeping Dogs Lie - Harlow's Lawyer (2014)
Venom - Jack the Bartender (2018)
Grey Elephant (TBA)

Television
Prison Break - Mack Andrews (2005–06)
Grey's Anatomy - Paramedic 2 in "Sweet Surrender", Paramedic 3 in "Drowning On Dry Land", "A Change is Gonna Come" and "What a Difference a Day Makes"
Arrested Development - Coast Guardsman in "Queen Bee", "Borderline Personalities", "Indian Takers" and "Colony Collapse"
Kingdom - Mac Sullivan (2014–16)
The Night Shift - Mac Reily/Reily (6 episodes, 2016–17)
Longmire - Duncan Butler in "A Fog That Won't Lift" and "One Good Memory"
Colony - Sgt. Jenkins (2017)
The Unit - MP#1 in "The Outsiders" (2007)
Without a Trace - Press in "Lost Boy" (2007)
Lincoln Heights - Officer Ferguson in "Out with a Bang" (2007)
Jericho - Medic in "Condor" (2007)
Entourage - Smoke Jumper 2 in "Seth Green Day" (2008)
Mental - Darren Knuth in "Book of Judges" (2009)
Raising the Bar - Officer Tommy Boozang in "Fine and Dandy" (2009)
The Mentalist - Xander in "Red Menace" (2009)
Three Rivers - Mick in "Good Intentions" (2009)
NCIS: Los Angeles - Mick Benelli in "The Bank Job" (2010)
Cold Case - Preston Schmall in "The Last Drive-In" (2010)
Bones - Jesse Wilson in "The Twisted Bones in the Melted Truck" (2010)
The Event - Mall Cop in "One Will Live, One Will Die" (2011)
Harry's Law - Marcus in "There Will Be Blood" (2011)
CSI: Miami - Victor Shetland in "A Few Dead Men" (2011)
CSI: NY - Nathan Brody in "The Real McCoy" (2012)
Hawaii Five-0 - Craig Brant in "Hoa Pili" (2013)
Hello Ladies - Drunk Dude in "The Limo" (2013)
NCIS - Jake Spoke in "Once a Crook" (2013)
The 100 - Tor Lemkin in "Twilight's Last Gleaming" (2014)
Gang Related - Warren Davis in "Entre dos tierras" (2014)
Hot in Cleveland - Mac in "Win Win" (2014)
Castle - Jeremy in "Castle, P.I." (2015)
Chasing Life - Vance Madill in "One Day" (2015)
Scandal - Captain Weaver in "A Few Good Women" (2015)
Major Crimes - Kenny in "Fifth Dynasty" (2015)
Rizzoli and Isles - Wally Johnson in Murderjuana (2016)
Grimm - Ralph Rotterman in "Tree People" (2016)
Supernatural - Bucky Sims in "Celebrating the Life of Asa Fox" (2016)
FBI - Brick Peters in "Pilot" (2018)
9-1-1 - Eli in "Chimney Begins" (2019) "Ghost Stories [Halloween]" (2021)
Black Jesus - Jake Whiteman in "God's Team" (2019)
Lovecraft Country - Lancaster (2020)
 The Thing About Pam - Det. McCarrick (2022)
 The Cleaning Lady -Jon Price/The Motel Manager (2021) (3 episodes)

Video games
Killzone 3 - Kowalski
Firewatch - Ned Goodwin (Feb 2016)

References

External links

Year of birth missing (living people)
Living people
American male television actors